Rothenstein may refer to:

People
Rothenstein is a surname. Notable people with the surname include:

Conrad Zöllner von Rothenstein (1325–1390), Grand Master of the Teutonic Order from 1382 to 1390.
Sir William Rothenstein (1872–1945), English painter, printmaker, draughtsman, lecturer, and writer on art (father of John and Michael below)
Sir John Rothenstein (1901–1992), English arts administrator, art historia, and former director of the Tate
Michael Rothenstein (1908–1993), English printmaker, painter and art teacher

Places
Rothenstein, Germany, a municipality in Thuringia, population 1335 in 2011.
Rothenstein (Königsberg), a quarter of former Königsberg, East Prussia.

German-language surnames
Jewish surnames
Yiddish-language surnames